The Ligue 1 Player of the Year, is an award given to the player whose performances are considered to be the best, playing in Ligue 1. The award has been presented since the 1993–94 season and the first winner of the award was Paris Saint-Germain winger David Ginola. The current holder is Kylian Mbappé, who won the award for his performances throughout the 2021–22 campaign for Paris Saint-Germain.

Key
 Player (X) denotes the number of times a player has won the award (if more than one)
  Clubs with this background and symbol were Ligue 1 champions in the same season

Winners

This award has been presented 28 times as of 2022, with all winners being different aside from Pauleta who was the first two-time winner in 2001–02 and 2002–03, as well as the only other multiple-time winners Eden Hazard (in 2010–11 and 2011–12), Zlatan Ibrahimović (who won the award a record three times in 2012–13, 2013–14 and 2015–16) and Kylian Mbappé (who won a record three consecutive awards in 2018–19, 2020–21 and 2021–22).

Breakdown of winners

By country

By club

References

Player of the Year
Association football in France lists
French 2
Awards established in 1994
Lists of French sportspeople
1994 establishments in France